David E. Nahmias  (born September 11, 1964) is an American lawyer who served as the chief justice of the Supreme Court of Georgia from 2021 to 2022. He is the former United States Attorney for the Northern District of Georgia.

Background and early career
He attended Briarcliff High School and was the state's STAR student. He attended Duke University, where he graduated first in his class and summa cum laude, and Harvard Law School, where in 1991 he graduated magna cum laude and was an editor of the Harvard Law Review (along with President Obama).

Career
He clerked for Judge Laurence H. Silberman of the U.S. Court of Appeals for the District of Columbia and Justice Antonin Scalia of the U.S. Supreme Court during the 1992 Term.

He worked for law firm of Hogan & Hartson in Washington, D.C. In 1995,  Nahmias joined the U.S. Attorney's Office in Atlanta in January. In October 2001, Nahmias was detailed to the United States Department of Justice Criminal Division in Washington to serve as Counsel to the Assistant Attorney General.

After being nominated by President George W. Bush and confirmed by the United States Senate, on December 1, 2004, Nahmias returned home to Atlanta to take office as the United States Attorney for the Northern District of Georgia.

Georgia Supreme Court 
Nahmias was named to the Supreme Court of Georgia by Governor Sonny Perdue on August 13, 2009, to fill the vacancy left by the resignation of Leah Ward Sears. He took office on September 3, 2009, and won re-election in November 2010. On September 4, 2018, Nahmias was sworn in as Presiding Justice, replacing Harold Melton, who became Chief Justice on the same day. He was sworn in as Chief Justice on July 1, 2021. He resigned on July 17, 2022.

In 2020, Nahmias wrote a ruling that authorized a loophole that allowed any Georgia Supreme Court judge who faces a serious re-election challenge to resign and have the Georgia governor appoint a new judge to a full term, thus disincentivizing challenges against incumbents and undermining competitive elections.

See also 
 List of law clerks of the Supreme Court of the United States (Seat 9)

References

|-

1964 births
Living people
21st-century American judges
Chief Justices of the Supreme Court of Georgia (U.S. state)
Duke University alumni
Georgia (U.S. state) lawyers
Harvard Law School alumni
Justices of the Supreme Court of Georgia (U.S. state)
Law clerks of the Supreme Court of the United States
People associated with Hogan Lovells
United States Attorneys for the Northern District of Georgia